Events from the year 1935 in Ireland.

Incumbents
 Governor-General: Domhnall Ua Buachalla
 President of the Executive Council: Éamon de Valera (FF)

Events
3 January – an Anglo-Irish Coal-Cattle Pact is signed between the governments of Britain and the Irish Free State.
20 January – forty men from the Connemara Gaeltacht travel to County Meath to inspect the area which is to be settled by residents of the Gaeltacht.
27 January – relics and souvenirs of the 1916 Easter Rising arrive at the National Museum.
19 February – workmen unearth a statue of Jesus during excavations for road making in County Clare.
28 February – the Criminal Law Amendment Act deals with various sexual offences. Section 17 explicitly makes the import or sale of contraceptive devices illegal.
3 March – in his Lenten pastoral the Thomas O'Doherty, Bishop of Galway, denounces immodest dress and vulgar films.  Membership of Trinity College Dublin is still forbidden for Catholics and membership of the IRA and Communist organizations remain mortal sins.
20 March – after seventeen days of a bus strike, the army intervenes at the request of the Minister for Industry and Commerce by providing lorries for transport.
26 March – 72 republicans are arrested and held at the Bridewell Garda Station.
1 April – the National Athletics and Cycling Association is suspended from the International Amateur Athletic Federation for refusing to confine its activities to the Free State side of the border.
12 April – eleven families from the Connemara Gaeltacht arrive in County Meath to set up the Ráth Cairn Gaeltacht.
14 July – five people are killed and seventy injured as a result of sectarian rioting in Belfast.
26 October – Edward Carson, Baron Carson, the Dublin-born Unionist leader and barrister, is buried in Belfast.
9 November – Arranmore boat tragedy: 19 of 20 onboard are killed when a yawl runs aground on the crossing from Burtonport.
7 December – a bad day for Irish sport: the Ireland national rugby union team is beaten by New Zealand and the Irish soccer team is beaten by the Netherlands.
16 December – Foynes in County Limerick is chosen to be the European terminal of a transatlantic flying boat air service.
Undated
In the first major investigation into political corruption in Ireland since the formation of the Free State, the "Wicklow Gold Inquiry" clears Seán Lemass (Minister for Industry and Commerce) of wrongdoing in the grant of mining licences in County Wicklow to Fianna Fáil politicians.
 William Magner begins commercial cider production in Clonmel, County Tipperary.

Arts and literature
 2 April – First meeting of the Irish Folklore Commission, set up by the Government under the direction of Séamus Ó Duilearga to study and collect information on folklore and traditions.
 12 August – Seán O'Casey's play The Silver Tassie, set in World War I and premièred in 1929 in London, is first performed at the Abbey Theatre in Dublin, where it proves controversial.
 23 September – The fourth Theatre Royal opens in Dublin.
 Samuel Beckett publishes his poetry Echo's Bones and Other Precipitates.
 Sinéad de Valera produces her play Cluichidhe na Gaedhilge.
 Oliver St. John Gogarty publishes his first prose work, As I Was Going Down Sackville Street: A Phantasy in Fact.
 Norah Hoult publishes her novel Holy Ireland.
 Louis MacNeice publishes his Poems.
 W. B. Yeats publishes his poetry A Full Moon in March.

Sport

Football

League of Ireland
Winners: Dolphins

FAI Cup
Winners: Bohemians 4–3 Dundalk

Golf
Irish Open is won by Ernest Whitcombe (England).

Births
11 January – Colm O'Reilly, Bishop of Ardagh and Clonmacnoise (1983– ).
16 January – William Walsh, Bishop of Killaloe (1994– ).
9 February – Liam Kavanagh, Labour Party Teachta Dála representing Wicklow, Member of the European Parliament.
18 February –  – Ciarán Bourke, singer (d. 1988)
20 February – Bríd Rodgers, Social Democratic and Labour Party MLA and Minister.
21 February – Brian Mullooly, Fianna Fáil politician, twice Cathaoirleach of Seanad Éireann.
23 February – Tom Murphy, playwright (died 2018).
4 March – Don Davern, Fianna Fáil TD for Tipperary South 1965–1968 (died 1968).
6 March – Ronnie Delany, athlete.
20 March – Dermot FitzGerald, businessman and philanthropist (died 2006).
1 April – Billy Whelan, footballer (died 1958).
22 April – Tim Pat Coogan, historian and broadcaster.
25 April – John Boland, Roman Catholic bishop of the Diocese of Savannah, Georgia.
15 May – Barry Desmond, Labour Party TD, Cabinet Minister and MEP.
16 June – Peter Rice, structural engineer (died 1992).
18 June – Jimmy Brohan, Cork hurler.
July – Arthur Ryan, businessman (died 2019).
11 July – Oliver Napier, Northern Irish politician (died 2011)
20 July – Hugh Coveney, Fine Gael TD and Cabinet Minister, yachtsman (died 1998).
4 August – Michael J. Noonan, Fianna Fáil TD and Cabinet Minister.
13 August – Brendan Comiskey, Roman Catholic bishop of the Diocese of Ferns.
16 September – Charles McDonald, Fine Gael politician, Cathaoirleach (chair) of Seanad Éireann 1981–1982.
29 September – Ian Lewis, cricketer (died 2004).
16 October – Fred Tiedt, boxer (died 1999).
27 November – Johnny Byrne, writer and script editor (died 2008).
4 December – Noel Peyton, soccer player.
8 December – Michael Woods, Fianna Fáil TD for Dublin North-East and Cabinet Minister.
Full date unknown
Pauline Bewick, artist (born in England).
Eddie Fullerton, Sinn Féin councillor (killed by the Ulster Defence Association 1991).
Pádraig Ó Snodaigh, Irish language activist, poet, writer and publisher.
Bob Quinn, filmmaker, writer and photographer.

Deaths
23 March – Robert Browne, Roman Catholic Bishop of the Diocese of Cloyne (born 1844).
8 April – Patrick Joseph Sullivan, mayor of Casper, Wyoming and Republican member of the United States Senate from Wyoming (born 1865).
17 July – George William Russell ('Æ'), critic, poet, essayist, artist and economist (born 1867).
22 July – William Mulholland, water service engineer in Southern California (born 1855).
9 August – James Buchanan, 1st Baron Woolavington, businessman and philanthropist (born 1849).
15 September – Sir Thomas Esmonde, 11th Baronet, peer, MP and Seanad member (born 1862).
22 October – Edward Carson, Baron Carson, Unionist leader, barrister and judge (born 1854).

References

 
1930s in Ireland
Ireland
Years of the 20th century in Ireland